Herold is an unincorporated community located in the town of Belvidere, in Buffalo County, Wisconsin, United States. The community was named for William Herold, a farmer who became the community's first postmaster when the post office opened in April 1891.

References

Unincorporated communities in Buffalo County, Wisconsin
Unincorporated communities in Wisconsin